Museum education is a specialized field devoted to developing and strengthening the education role of informal education spaces and institutions such as museums.

In a critical report called Excellence and Equity published in 1992 by the American Association of Museums, the educational role of museums was identified as the core to museums' service to the public. As museum education has developed as a field of study and interest in its own right, efforts have been made to record its history and to establish a research agenda to strengthen its position as a discipline in the wider work of museums.

Description

Museum education falls under the broad category of informal education. Informal education is defined as "...any organized educational activity outside the established formal system—whether operating separately or as an important feature of some broader activity—that is intended to serve identifiable learning clienteles and learning objective".  This definition was later broadened to include the idea that non-formal education is any systematic educative activity, organized outside from the official framework to facilitate educative experiences for all people, regardless of age, genre, nationality, social, economic or health situation.  Informal education expands the definition of educational spaces to include learning that occurs in places like the home, national parks, zoos, and museums. Museum education has been set apart from other informal education largely due to education made available to museum educators and the specific learning objectives of the museums themselves.

History

Beginnings in art museums of the United States
At the turn of the twentieth century, art museums were very new institutions to the average visitor, who was seen wandering with no clear direction through the galleries, and with no clear idea on how to appreciate and study the exhibitions. In 1906, architect J. Randolph Coolidge Jr. was appointed the temporary director of the Boston Museum of Fine Arts. He experimented with a guiding system in the galleries, to help visitors orient themselves throughout their walk across the exhibitions.

Art Museum Volunteers as Museum Educators 
An article published in the June bulletin of the Museum of Fine Arts, Boston in 1906 features one of the first uses of the term docent and the description of its functions. It said, After the conclusion of WWII, art museums' priorities shifted once again to an increased focus on education. Schools across the country began making field trips to museums for educational programs, and at the same time a greater emphasis was being placed on collecting and volunteerism. This emphasis on volunteerism, combined with the increase in student attendance, led to a greater level of importance given to museum education and museum educators. By 1946, museum leaders like Otto Wittmann, the then associate director at the Toledo Museum of Art, were advocating for the use of volunteers (docents), and the development of museum educator training, for expanding education programs.

Speaking on his conceptualization of the perfect museum volunteer educator candidate, Wittmann said, “She is a married woman, thirty to thirty-five years old, with one or two children in school, and a husband in an executive position. She has attended exhibitions quite regularly for several years and has for some time brought her children to your classes and special events. She has some years of college education but is not always a graduate. She seldom has formal training related to her volunteer job but may have developed useful skills in other activities. She works well with her hands, likes people (especially children), and is at ease and talks easily with them. Most important — she has a curiosity, imagination, and enthusiasm, and she believes in the importance of your organization to the community”

WWII impacts on informal education 
In 1968, in his first report as the first Assistant Secretary of State for Education and Culture, Philip H. Coombs emphasized the increment of the educative needs of the world’s population after World War II. In it, he mentions the diversity of informal education activities that constitute, or should constitute, an important complement to formal education to the total educational efforts of any country. To Coombs, informal education had the potential to satisfy the learning demands of individuals and collectivities because unlike the more rigid traditional education, informal education is flexible and takes into consideration local culture, economy and society, which counteracts the tendency of developing countries to imitate education models of developed countries.

Throughout his career, Coombs encouraged and impulsed the professional development of people responsible of non-formal education, which will be determining for the development and professionalization of the educative areas in institutions devoted to non-formal education.

Museum education workers 
A 2019 demographic study demonstrated a long-standing homogeneity among art museum educators, who tend to be White, heterosexual, cisgender women between the ages of 26-40 with spouses but without care-taking responsibilities. These demographics point to historical conditions of low pay and pervasiveness of unpaid internships, which limit participation to those with access to other sources of income. Unpaid internships have become prerequisites to securing future employment in the field, as they offer opportunities for networking and demonstrating one’s employability, creating a “cruel paradox” in the field in which paid employment is restricted to those with the economic resources to contribute unpaid labor.

The titles of museum educators are important for two reasons. One reason is that they evidence the field’s struggle for vocabulary to define what it is museum educators do. The second reason is that these job titles may reflect differences in the positions themselves, and growing differences in the roles of education departments across museums. Including Director/Chair of Education, Director of Education and Public Programs, Curator of Education, Education and Interpretation Supervisor, Head of Interpretation and Participatory Experiences, Director of Education and Curator of Public Practices, etc.

There is a growing number of graduate programs in museum education, including: a Master's and PhD in Arts Administration, Education, & Policy from Ohio State University; a Master's from Bank Street College of Education; and a Master's from Tufts University in Museum Studies; and others.

Effects of COVID-19 Pandemic 
The American Alliance of Museum and Wilkening Consulting released a survey snap shot of COVID-19 Impact on United States Museums 

The survey includes information on museum closures, visitation numbers, furloughs and lost revenue. The staff positions most affected by layoffs and furloughs due to COVID19 at the surveyed institutions were Guest Services/Admissions/Front of House/Retail (68%) followed by Education (40%). 67% of surveyed museums reported needing to cut back on education, programming, and other public service due to budget shortfalls and/or staff reductions.

Due to the COVID-19 pandemic, almost 95% of museums worldwide had to close their doors for at least part of 2020. The widespread impact of COVID-19 is further illustrated by the fact that 99% of arts organizations of all kinds in the U.S. had to cancel events in 2020. Due to these forced closures and out of the interest of abiding by pandemic safety guidelines, museums began turning to the digital realm for programming and educational efforts. Many museums created or added onto virtual education programs, including; Zoom or video-conferenced events, new social media channels and groups, take-home art activities, virtual tours, and more.

Theory & Practice 
Museum pedagogy is influenced by constructivism, postmodernism, and critical multiculturalism. Museum educators employ different teaching strategies, including Visual Thinking Strategies (VTS) and the dialogical model of art interpretation. This can culminate into many different end products including brightly colored museum displays, interactive display elements, and informational books and pamphlets.  Other pedagogical strategies include Feldman’s Model of Art Criticism, aesthetic scanning, and FTC Palette

Publications

 Excellence in Practice: Museum Education Principles and Standards was developed by the Education Committee of the American Association of Museums to help guide and inform the practice of Museum Education.
 The Journal of Museum Education (JME) is a journal covering the theory, training and practice of the museum education field from the Museum Education Roundtable. Articles are written by museum, education, and research professionals. 
 The Museum Education Monitor was a monthly email newsletter that tracked and recorded research and resources in museum education worldwide. Publication of the Museum Education Monitor ended in 2015.
 Art Museum Teaching is a digitally published resource and collaborative online forum for reflecting on issues of teaching, learning, and experimental practice in the field of art museum education. 
Viewfinder: Reflecting on Museum Education is a peer-reviewed digital publication from the National Art Education Association. 
 Studies in Art Education is a quarterly journal that reports quantitative, qualitative, historical, and philosophical research in art education. 
 Journal of Cultural Research in Art Education (jCRAE) is an annual publication of the United States Society for Education through Art and is completely accessible online.

Professional Organizations 
The Museum Education Division of the National Art Education Association (NAEA) has over 620 members across North America, working through regional representatives and task forces. The division also hosts a Museum Education Preconvention before the NAEA annual conference.

The Museum Education Roundtable provides scholarship and professional learning for museum educators through regional networks and producing the publication The Journal of Museum Education.

The American Alliance of Museums (AAM) and the International Council of Museums (ICOM) are both open for membership to museum professionals. AAM and ICOM each maintain codes of ethics for museums, which detail expectations for professional conduct.

See also
 Museology
Museums 
Art education
Category:Art museums and galleries in the United States by state

References

External links

 Museum-Ed, an online organization devoted to meeting the needs of museum educators by providing tools and resources by and for the museum education community
 The Museum Education Roundtable, publisher of the Journal of Museum Education
 New York City Museum Educators Roundtable, a forum for museum education professionals to address issues of museum and educational interest, exchange and disseminate relevant information and to explore and implement cooperative programming opportunities through roundtable discussions, workshops, and an annual conference.
 Art Museum Teaching, a digital community and collaborative online forum for reflecting on issues of teaching, learning, and experimental practice in the field of art museum education. The site's goal is to connect educators, ideas, and resources around a dialogue about shared practice in teaching and learning.
American Alliance of Museums' Education Professional Network (EdCom) A committee on museum education that works to advance the purpose of museums as places of lifelong learning, serves as an advocate for diverse audiences and educators, and promotes professional standards and excellence in the practice of museum education.

 
Museology
Cultural education